Kerpen or von Kerpen is a surname. Notable people with the surname include:

 Dave Kerpen, American author, entrepreneur, and speaker
 Otto von Kerpen (died 1208)
 Phil Kerpen, American policy analyst and political organizer
 Wilhelm Lothar Maria von Kerpen (1741–1823)